Ben Aden (887m) is a mountain in the Northwest Highlands of Scotland. It lies on the Knoydart peninsula in Lochaber.

Regarded as one of the finest Corbetts in Scotland and one of the toughest to climb, the mountain is steep and rocky on all sides. The nearest village is Inverie.

References

Mountains and hills of the Northwest Highlands
Marilyns of Scotland
Corbetts